Kiran Imran Dar is a Pakistani politician who has been a member of the National Assembly of Pakistan, since August 2018. Previously she was a member of the National Assembly from April 2015 to May 2018 and a member of the Provincial Assembly of the Punjab from 2008 to 2015.

Political career
She was elected to the Provincial Assembly of the Punjab as a candidate of Pakistan Muslim League (N) (PML-N) on a reserved seats for women in 2008 Pakistani general election.

She was re-elected to the Provincial Assembly of the Punjab as a candidate of PML-N on a reserved seats for women in 2013 Pakistani general election.

She was elected to the National Assembly of Pakistan as a candidate of PML-N on a reserved seats for women from Punjab in April 2015 following the resignation of Ayesha Raza Farooq.

She was re-elected to the National Assembly as a candidate of PML-N on a seat reserved for women from Punjab in the 2018 Pakistani general election.

References

Living people
Pakistan Muslim League (N) MPAs (Punjab)
Pakistan Muslim League (N) MNAs
Pakistani MNAs 2013–2018
Year of birth missing (living people)
Women members of the National Assembly of Pakistan
Punjab MPAs 2013–2018
Women members of the Provincial Assembly of the Punjab
Punjab MPAs 2008–2013
Pakistani MNAs 2018–2023
Pakistani people of Kashmiri descent
21st-century Pakistani women politicians